Micky Modelle (born Michael Modine in 1972) is a Northern Irish disc jockey and record producer from Belfast, Northern Ireland.

Career
He came into the media spotlight in 2006, when he had a hit with Belgian singer Jessy, "Dancing in the Dark" was originally released by Jessy in 2004 in Belgium. However, after meeting Jessy, he remixed the song in 2006. The song gained him chart success. It peaked at number ten on the UK Singles Chart, number five in the Republic of Ireland and number seven in Jessy's native Belgium. The song also peaked at number twenty five in Switzerland. The second single, "Over You" achieved moderate success, peaking at number thirty-five on the UK Singles Chart and eighteen on Irish Singles Chart, respectively.

Later on in 2008, he remixed Samantha Mumba's "Gotta Tell You" and she re-recorded the vocals to fit the song, a music video was shot in London and Dublin. She promoted the song on the Clubland Live Tour in 2008, but it did not chart on the UK Singles Chart, but did peak at number forty on the UK Dance Chart. He also joined the judging panel of the Belfast CityBeat contest Young Star Search. He will produce the singles for winners Rachel Pearson and Caitlin McClurg.

Modelle was named DJ of the year in Ireland in 2000.

Discography

Singles

Remixes

Pink God is A Dj ( Electroheadz Remix)

References

External links
 Official website

Living people
British DJs
DJs from Belfast
Club DJs
1972 births
DJs from Northern Ireland